"I Was Only Joking" is a song written by Gary Grainger and Rod Stewart released by Stewart in 1978 as the third single on his 1977 album, Foot Loose & Fancy Free. The song performed well, reaching the Top 40 in various countries, including the United Kingdom (No. 5) and the United States (No. 22). In the UK, "I Was Only Joking" charted as part of a double A-side with "Hot Legs".

The song is one of Stewart's most loved songs, containing some of his finest sets of lyrics. A heartfelt tale of youth looked on from a now-mature perspective in regret and sorrow. A long guitar solo features, starting with acoustic then moving to electric. The solo is played by Stewart’s frequent collaborator and English guitarist Jim Cregan. It is seen as one of the best guitar solos in classic rock.

Reception
Billboard said that Stewart is in "top form interpreting insightful lyrics over a rhythmic, semi-acoustic rock foundation," and Billboard also praised the string and mandolin playing.  Cash Box called the song "a gentle ballad about growing and learning" and called the guitar playing "clean."  Record World called it "perhaps the most thoughtful song" from "Foot Loose and Fancy Free."

Chart performance

Weekly charts

Year-end charts

References

Rod Stewart songs
1978 singles
Songs written by Rod Stewart
Songs written by Gary Grainger
1977 songs
Warner Records singles
Music videos directed by Bruce Gowers
Song recordings produced by Tom Dowd